The 1898–99 Nebraska Cornhuskers men's basketball team represented the University of Nebraska during the 1898–99 collegiate men's basketball season. The head coach was Frank Lehmer, coaching the huskers in his third season. The team played their home games at Grant Memorial Hall in Lincoln, Nebraska.

Schedule

|-

References

Nebraska Cornhuskers men's basketball seasons
Nebraska